Stephanie Brunner (born 20 February 1994) is an Austrian World Cup alpine ski racer. 
Born in Schwaz, Tyrol, she specializes in the technical events of Slalom and Giant slalom, and made her World Cup debut on 17 March 2012. On the European Cup circuit, Brunner won the 2016 season title in giant slalom and was second in the overall standings.

World Cup results

Season standings

Standings through 18 December 2018

Race podiums

 1 podium – (1 GS) 
 10 top fives

World Championship results

Olympic results

References

External links

Austrian Ski team (ÖSV) – Stephanie Brunner – 
Head Skis – Stephanie Brunner
 – 

1994 births
Austrian female alpine skiers
Living people
Alpine skiers at the 2018 Winter Olympics
Alpine skiers at the 2022 Winter Olympics
Olympic alpine skiers of Austria
Medalists at the 2018 Winter Olympics
Olympic medalists in alpine skiing
Olympic silver medalists for Austria
People from Schwaz
Sportspeople from Tyrol (state)
20th-century Austrian women
21st-century Austrian women